In enzymology, a steroid N-acetylglucosaminyltransferase is an enzyme that catalyzes the chemical reaction

UDP-N-acetyl-D-glucosamine + estradiol-17alpha 3-D-glucuronoside  UDP + 17alpha-(N-acetyl-D-glucosaminyl)-estradiol 3-D-glucuronoside

Thus, the two substrates of this enzyme are UDP-N-acetyl-D-glucosamine and estradiol-17alpha 3-D-glucuronoside, whereas its two products are UDP and 17alpha-(N-acetyl-D-glucosaminyl)-estradiol 3-D-glucuronoside.

This enzyme belongs to the family of glycosyltransferases, specifically the hexosyltransferases.  The systematic name of this enzyme class is UDP-N-acetyl-D-glucosamine:estradiol-17alpha-3-D-glucuronoside 17alpha-N-acetylglucosaminyltransferase. Other names in common use include hydroxy steroid acetylglucosaminyltransferase, steroid acetylglucosaminyltransferase, uridine diphosphoacetylglucosamine-steroid, and acetylglucosaminyltransferase.

References

 

EC 2.4.1
Enzymes of unknown structure